River Plaza is a 524 ft (160m) tall skyscraper in Chicago, Illinois. It was completed in 1977 and has 56 floors, of which 51 are residential with a total of 678 units. Gordon & Levin designed the building, which is the 74th tallest building in Chicago.

River Plaza was converted from a rental building to condominiums in 1994 and is currently managed by Community Specialists.

See also
List of tallest buildings in Chicago

References

External links
River Plaza Website

Residential skyscrapers in Chicago
Residential condominiums in Chicago
Residential buildings completed in 1977
1977 establishments in Illinois